Johncock is a surname of British origin. People so named include:

 Gordon Johncock (born 1936), American racing driver
 Graham Johncock (born 1982), Australian rules footballer
 Rachel Johncock (born 1993), Welsh sprinter
 Brian Johnson (special effects artist) (born 1939), British special effects artist born Brian Johncock